Epigomphus maya is a species of dragonfly in the family Gomphidae. It is endemic to Belize. Its natural habitats are subtropical or tropical moist lowland forests and rivers. It is threatened by habitat loss.

Sources 

Gomphidae
Insects of Central America
Endemic fauna of Belize
Insects described in 1989
Taxonomy articles created by Polbot